Shooting at the 1996 Summer Paralympics consisted of 15 events.

Medal table

Participating nations

Medal summary

References 

 

1996 Summer Paralympics events
1996
Paralympics
Shooting competitions in the United States